Hannah Rachael Wall (born 3 May 1991) is an association football player who represented New Zealand at the FIFA U-17 Women's World Cup, FIFA U-20 Women's World Cup and at full New Zealand international level.

International career
She was a member of the New Zealand squad in the inaugural FIFA U-17 Women's World Cup held in New Zealand in 2007, and played in all three group games against Canada, Denmark and also the 3–1 victory over Colombia.

Wall also represented New Zealand at the 2008 FIFA U-20 Women's World Cup in Chile, again playing all three group games; a 2–3 loss to Nigeria, a 4–3 win over hosts Chile, and a 1–1 draw with England. In 2010, she represented New Zealand at the 2010 FIFA U-20 Women's World Cup, appearing in all three group games.

Wall made her senior Football Ferns debut in a 0–6 loss to China on 10 January 2009.

References

External links

1991 births
Living people
New Zealand women's association footballers
New Zealand women's international footballers
Association footballers from Wellington City
Women's association football forwards